Hedgehog acyltransferase (HHAT), also called skinny hedgehog homology in humans, is a human gene.

The HHAT gene encodes an enzyme that catalyzes N-terminal palmitoylation of sonic hedgehog. Mutations in HHAT produce a phenotype that is similar to loss of hedgehog function.  Finally the HHAT protein shares a short but significant sequence similarity to membrane-bound O-acyltransferases.

References

External links